Ricardo Villalba is an Argentine forester and dendrochronologist specialized in paleoclimate studies. He is active at CRICYT in Mendoza, Argentina. He was one of the authors of the IPCC Fourth Assessment Report.

Beginning in 2017 Villaba has faced legal charges from the environmental NGO Jáchal No se Toca. Villalba is accused of having led, as director of IANIGLA, a deficient survey of glaciers in the Jáchal area which led to various glaciers being left out. This would according to Jáchal No Se Toca have made it possible for Barrick Gold to install a mine the area with the ensuing pollution that followed. Argentine and international scientists have criticized the accusation against Villalba and the topic has been covered by the journals Science and Nature.

References

Ricardo Villalba

Argentine foresters
Argentine scientists
Paleoclimatologists
Intergovernmental Panel on Climate Change lead authors
Academic staff of the Austral University of Chile
Academic staff of the University of Concepción
Academic staff of the National University of Comahue
Year of birth missing (living people)
Living people